Bridge in Snake Spring Township, also known as the Narrows Bridge, is a historic concrete arch bridge located at The Narrows in Snake Spring Township in Bedford County, Pennsylvania. The roadway is skewed and carries US 30, the Lincoln Highway, over the Raystown Branch Juniata River.

It was listed on the National Register of Historic Places in 1988.

See also
List of bridges documented by the Historic American Engineering Record in Pennsylvania

References

External links

Road bridges on the National Register of Historic Places in Pennsylvania
Bridges completed in 1934
Bridges in Bedford County, Pennsylvania
Historic American Engineering Record in Pennsylvania
National Register of Historic Places in Bedford County, Pennsylvania
Concrete bridges in the United States
Open-spandrel deck arch bridges in the United States
1934 establishments in Pennsylvania